is a former Japanese football player.

Playing career
Yamao was born in Nagoya on April 13, 1973. After graduating from Aichi Gakuin University, he joined his local club Nagoya Grampus Eight in 1996. However he could not play at all in the match. In 1997, he moved to Japan Football League club Ventforet Kofu. He played as regular player as center back in 2 seasons. In 1999, he moved to newly was promoted to J2 League club, FC Tokyo. The club was promoted to J1 League from 2000. Although he played as center back, he could not play many matches. In May 2002, he moved to J2 club Cerezo Osaka. He played many matches and the club was promoted to J1. In 2003, he moved to J2 club Yokohama FC. He played as regular player as center back in 3 seasons. He retired end of 2005 season.

Club statistics

References

External links

jsgoal.jp

1973 births
Living people
Aichi Gakuin University alumni
Association football people from Aichi Prefecture
Japanese footballers
J1 League players
J2 League players
Japan Football League (1992–1998) players
Nagoya Grampus players
Ventforet Kofu players
FC Tokyo players
Cerezo Osaka players
Yokohama FC players
Association football defenders